The Nicobar  Islands are an archipelagic island chain in the eastern Indian Ocean.

UNESCO has declared the Great Nicobar Island as one of the World Network of Biosphere Reserves.

Geography
They comprise three distinct groups:

Northern Group:
 Car Nicobar
 Battimalv

Central Group:
 Chowra, Chaura or Sanenyo
 Teressa or Luroo
 Bompuka or Poahat
 Katchal
 Camorta
 Nancowry or Nancowrie
 Trinket
 Laouk or "Isle of Man"
 Tillangchong

Southern Group (Sambelong):
 Great Nicobar (largest island of the Nicobars)
 Little Nicobar
 Kondul Island
 Pulo Milo or Pillomilo (Milo Island)
 Meroe, Trak, Treis, Menchal, Kabra, Pigeon and Megapod

Geology
The Nicobar Islands are part of a great island arc created by the collision of the Indo-Australian Plate with Eurasia. The collision lifted the Himalayas and most of the Indonesian islands, and created a long arc of highlands and islands, which includes the Arakan Yoma range of Burma, the Andaman and Nicobar islands, and the islands off the west coast of Sumatra, including the Banyak Islands and Mentawai Islands.

Climate
Rainfall is heavy due to annual monsoons and measures around  each year.

Ecology

The Nicobar Islands are recognised as a distinct terrestrial ecoregion, the Nicobar Islands rain forests, with many endemic species.

The vegetation of the Nicobars is typically divided into the coastal mangrove forests and the interior evergreen and deciduous tropical and subtropical moist broadleaf forests. Additionally, several islands contain extensive inland grasslands, though these are thought to have resulted from human intervention.

As a result of lower sea levels during the ice ages, the Andaman Islands were linked to the Southeast Asian mainland, but it is not believed that the Nicobar Islands ever had a land bridge to the continent. Lower sea levels did link the islands to one another: Great Nicobar and Little Nicobar were linked to each other, and Nancowry, Chaura, Katchall, Trinka, Camorta, and the nearby smaller islands were linked to one another as well.

Protected areas
Protected areas include Campbell Bay National Park and Galathea National Park on Great Nicobar.

A World Biosphere Reserve was declared on Grand Nicobar by UNESCO on May 31, 2013. The core area of  comprises Cambell Bay and Galathea National parks. A buffer area of  includes lands adjacent to and between the two parks.

Population

The islands had a population of 36,842 at the 2011. The indigenous ethnic groups are the Nicobarese and the Shompen. Local languages include Shompen and the languages of the Nicobarese group.

History

Prehistory 

The Nicobar Islands are believed to have been inhabited for thousands of years. Six indigenous Nicobarese languages are spoken on the islands, which are part of the Austroasiatic language family, which includes Mon, Khmer and Vietnamese languages of Southeast Asia, and the Munda languages of India. An indigenous tribe living at the southern tip of Great Nicobar, called the Shompen, may be of Mesolithic South-east Asian origin.

Origin of the name 
The earliest extant references to the name "Nicobar" is in the Sri Lankan Pali Buddhist chronicles, the Dipavamsa (c. 3rd or 4th century CE) and the Mahavamsa (c. 4th or 5th century), which state that the children of the followers of the legendary founder of the Sri Lankan Kingdom, Vijaya, landed on Naggadipa (the island of the children, from the Pali nagga meaning 'naked').  The modern name is likely derived from the Chola dynasty name for the islands, Nakkavaram (may be referring open/naked land or naked mans land in Tamil) which is inscribed on the Thanjavur (Tanjore) inscription of 1050 CE. Marco Polo (12th-13th century) also referred to this island as 'Necuverann'.

In the 15th century, Great Nicobar Island was recorded as "Cui Lan island" (翠蘭嶼) during the voyages of Zheng He in the Mao Kun map of the Wu Bei Zhi.

Colonial period 
The history of organised European colonisation on the islands began with the Danish East India Company in 1754/56. During this time they were  administrated from Tranquebar (in continental Danish India) administrated under the name of Frederiksøerne; missionaries from the Moravian Church Brethren's settlement in Tranquebar attempted a settlement on Nancowry and died in great numbers from disease; the islands were repeatedly abandoned due to outbreaks of malaria: 1784–1807/09, 1830–1834 and finally from 1848 gradually for good. Between 1778 and 1783, William Bolts attempted to establish an Austrian colony on the islands on the mistaken assumption that Denmark–Norway had abandoned its claims to the islands.

Italy made an attempt at buying the Nicobar Islands from Denmark between 1864 and 1865. The negotiations were interrupted and never brought up again.
 
Denmark's presence in the islands ended formally on 16 October 1868 when it sold the rights to the Nicobar Islands to the UK, which, in 1869, made them part of British India.

Second World War
During the Second World War, the islands were invaded and occupied by Japan between 1942 and 1945. In May 1945,  shelled Japanese positions on the islands. The British regained possession of the islands after the Surrender of Japan, announced on 15 August and formally signed on 2 September 1945.

Indian state
Together with the Andaman Islands, it became part of India in 1950 and was declared as a union territory of the nation in 1956.

26 December 2004 tsunami
On 26 December 2004, the coast of the Nicobar Islands was devastated by a  tsunami following the 2004 Indian Ocean earthquake. At least 6,000 people were killed on the Andaman and Nicobar Islands with reports putting the death toll on Katchal Island alone at 4,600.

Several islands were heavily damaged with initial reports of islands broken in two or three pieces and coral reefs moved above water. Teressa Island was said to have been split into two pieces and Trinkat Island into three pieces.

Indira Point subsided  and the lighthouse there was damaged.

Transportation
 Seaport: At least one small shipping dock is located in Campbell Bay on the East coast of Great Nicobar.  Car Nicobar has a small dock at its Northern tip near Keating Point and Mus.

See also

 Nicobarese people
 Nicobarese languages
 Shompen people
 Austrian colonization of the Nicobar Islands
 1881 Nicobar Islands earthquake
 Great Nicobar Biosphere Reserve
 Great Nicobar
 Malaysia Airlines Flight MH370
 Indian Ocean

References

External links 

  
 WorldStatesmen- India

Nicobar
Archipelagoes of the Indian Ocean
Archipelagoes of Southeast Asia
Islands of the Andaman and Nicobar Islands
Archipelagoes of the Andaman and Nicobar Islands

Bay of Bengal
British India
Danish India
Tropical and subtropical moist broadleaf forests
Maritime Southeast Asia
Regions of India
States and territories established in 1950
Pleistocene volcanoes
Volcanoes of India
Archipelagoes of India
1754 establishments in the Danish colonial empire
1868 establishments in the British Empire